(614433) 2009 KK is an Apollo near-Earth asteroid which was listed for several weeks in May and June 2009 on the Sentry Risk Table with a Torino Scale rating of 1. There was a 1 in 10000 chance of an impact on 29 May 2022. On 22 May 2009, it was listed as one of two near-earth objects assessed above Level 0 for potential impacts within 100 years, the other being 2007 VK184. As of 10 June 2009 it was downgraded to Level 0 as the cumulative Earth-impact probability was assessed as 7.9e-06 or 1 in 127,000. On 17 June 2009, JPL removed 2009 KK from the list of potential Earth impactors. It is now known that on 4 May 2022 the asteroid will be  from Earth.

2194 passage 
But the nominal solution shows the asteroid passing  from Earth.

References

External links 
 
 
 

614433
614433
20090507